Petcheys Bay is a rural locality in the local government area (LGA) of Huon Valley in the South-east LGA region of Tasmania. The 2021 census recorded a population of 194 for the locality of Petcheys Bay.

History 
Petcheys Bay was gazetted as a locality in 1971. It is believed to be named for William Petchey, an early settler in the area.

Geography
The waters of the Huon River estuary form the southern boundary.

Road infrastructure 
Route C639 (Cygnet Coast Road) runs through from south-west to south-east.

References

Towns in Tasmania
Localities of Huon Valley Council